Emily Grace Reaves (born January 13, 2001) is an American former actress and model.

Life and career
Reaves' acting career began when she first appeared in a 2008 episode of ER. She may be best recognized as Cindy Lou in Hannah Montana: The Movie. In addition to acting, she is a fashion designer and model. In 2010, Reaves and her former best friend Noah Cyrus, who is also her co-star in Mostly Ghostly: Who Let the Ghosts Out?, promoted a high-end clothing line for children and teenagers called the Emily  Grace Collection.  She and Cyrus also created their own web show, known as The Noie and Ems Show, that ran between 2009 and 2010. She and Cyrus also went on tour with Miley in 2009 filming their show while touring through the United States.  She starred in a short film called Melissa with her friend Sophie Texeira, where she portrays an 8-year-old girl who dies suddenly of cancer. She also created a foundation to help raise money for St. Jude Children's Research Hospital, called The Lollipops & Rainbows Foundation, which was launched on May 2, 2009.

Fashion career
Emily Grace Reaves had a collection of poufy dresses from child brand Ooh, La La! Couture. The brand consisted with pettiskirt dresses and tank/skirt sets. In 2010, she launched another clothing line with Three Peas Co. The line included pettiskirts, jackets, dresses, and petti-dresses. In 2011, Reaves revealed that she had another clothing line co designed by her mom, Edi, that would launch in Spring, 2012 called Rockabilly Dollz by Edi and Ems. The clothing line contained southern-rock style shirts, skirts, leggings, and dresses. In an interview with Reaves in June 2012, she said that Rockabilly Dollz was "...still in the manufacturing business." As of March 2013, Emily Grace Reaves has not launched the much-anticipated Rockabilly Dollz clothing line.

Filmography

References

External links 

2001 births
21st-century American actresses
Actresses from Tennessee
American child actresses
American child models
American fashion designers
American film actresses
American television actresses
Living people
People from Franklin, Tennessee
Actresses from Tulsa, Oklahoma
American women fashion designers